John Edward McCormack (July 6, 1917 – March 14, 1953) was a lawyer and political figure in Saskatchewan. He represented Souris-Estevan from 1948 to 1953 in the Legislative Assembly of Saskatchewan as a Liberal.

He was born in Estevan, Saskatchewan, the son of Albert McCormack and Bertha Rech, and was educated there and at the University of Saskatchewan. McCormack lived in Estevan. He served as a squadron leader in the Royal Canadian Air Force during World War II. McCormack died in office in Regina at the age of 35 as the result of an automobile accident.

References 

Saskatchewan Liberal Party MLAs
1917 births
1953 deaths
Road incident deaths in Canada
Accidental deaths in Saskatchewan